The 1990 Highland Regional Council election to the Highland Regional Council was held on 3 May 1990 as part of the wider 1990 Scottish regional elections. Independents won control of 36 of the council's 52 seats.

Turnout was 42.9% in the 27 of the region's 52 districts that were contested.

Aggregate results

Ward results

References

1990 Scottish local elections
1990